Healy's Bridge railway station was on the Cork and Muskerry Light Railway in County Cork, Ireland.

History

The station opened on 8 August 1887.

Passenger services were withdrawn on 31 December 1934.

Routes

Further reading

References

Disused railway stations in County Cork
Railway stations opened in 1887
Railway stations closed in 1934
1887 establishments in Ireland
1934 disestablishments in Ireland
Railway stations in the Republic of Ireland opened in the 19th century